Martha Concepción Figueroa Torres (born 17 July 1952 in Santa Bárbara) is a Honduran teacher and politician. She currently serves as deputy and Fifth Vice-president of the National Congress of Honduras representing the National Party of Honduras for Santa Bárbara.

References

1952 births
Living people
People from Santa Bárbara Department, Honduras
Deputies of the National Congress of Honduras
National Party of Honduras politicians
20th-century Honduran women politicians
20th-century Honduran politicians
21st-century Honduran women politicians
21st-century Honduran politicians